Kevin Gissi (born 10 September 1992) is a Swiss professional footballer who plays as a forward.

Club career
Gissi finished his formation with Étoile Carouge FC, and moved back to Argentina in 2007, signing with Arsenal de Sarandí. However, he failed to make a first team appearance with the club, only being assigned to U21 squad.

On 6 July 2012 Gissi returned to Switzerland, signing a one-year deal with Servette FC. He scored his first goal for Servette against Gandzasar FC in the UEFA Europa League qualifiers, and made his first start for the club in the derby against FC Sion.

On 1 September 2013 Gissi moved to Spain, signing with CD Alcoyano.

Prior to the 2014 Latvian Higher League season, on 14 January 2014, Gissi signed with FC Jūrmala. He left the team in mid-summer, having appeared in 2 league matches.

In January 2015 Gissi joined the Spanish Segunda División B club CF Badalona. As of July 2016, Gissi is playing with Rampla Juniors in Uruguay.

On 30 July 2021, he joined to Italian Serie C club Piacenza. On 25 January 2022, he moved to Prato, where he played the rest of the season.

Personal life
Gissi's older brother, Dylan, is also a footballer.

References

External links

1992 births
Living people
Footballers from Geneva
Swiss people of Argentine descent
Sportspeople of Argentine descent
Swiss men's footballers
Association football forwards
Swiss Super League players
Servette FC players
Primera Nacional players
Arsenal de Sarandí footballers
Independiente Rivadavia footballers
Deportivo Morón footballers
Estudiantes de Río Cuarto footballers
Segunda División B players
CD Alcoyano footballers
CF Badalona players
UE Sant Andreu footballers
Latvian Higher League players
FC Jūrmala players
Uruguayan Primera División players
Rampla Juniors players
Centro Atlético Fénix players
Serie C players
A.C. Cuneo 1905 players
Piacenza Calcio 1919 players
A.C. Prato players
C.D. Técnico Universitario footballers
Swiss expatriate footballers
Swiss expatriate sportspeople in Argentina
Swiss expatriate sportspeople in Spain
Swiss expatriate sportspeople in Italy
Expatriate footballers in Argentina
Expatriate footballers in Spain
Expatriate footballers in Latvia
Expatriate footballers in Uruguay
Expatriate footballers in Italy